Bani Yekkeh (also Romanized as Banī Yekkeh and Banī Yakeh; also known as Banī Tekyeh, Bani Yaki, Beyn Yekī, and Bīn Yakī) is a village in Abarj Rural District, Dorudzan District, Marvdasht County, Fars Province, Iran. At the 2006 census, its population was 858, in 193 families.

References 

Populated places in Marvdasht County